The Tristan albatross (Diomedea dabbenena) is a large seabird from the albatross family. One of the great albatrosses of the genus Diomedea, it was only widely recognised as a full species in 1998.

Taxonomy
Albatrosses belong to the family Diomedeidae of the order Procellariiformes, along with shearwaters, petrels, storm petrels, and diving petrels. They share certain identifying features. First, they have nasal passages that attach to the upper bill called naricorns, although the nostrils on the albatross are on the sides of the bill. The bills of Procellariiformes are also unique in that they are split into between 7 and 9 horny plates. Albatrosses also produce a stomach oil made up of wax esters and triglycerides that is stored in the proventriculus. This is used against predators as well as an energy rich food source for chicks and for the adults during their long flights.

While not all scientists believe it is a full species with some retaining it as a subspecies of the wandering albatross, a 2004 study of the mitochondrial DNA of the wandering albatross species complex supported the split. Other studies have shown it to be the most genetically distinct member of the wandering albatross superspecies. This may be due to it diverging from their common ancestor before all its relatives, or because it underwent particularly strong genetic drift. Among the major experts, BirdLife International has split this species, Clements has not yet, and the SACC has a proposal on the table to split it.

Etymology
Diomedea refers to Diomedes, whose companions turned to birds.

Description
It is practically indistinguishable from the wandering albatross at sea; the Tristan albatross is smaller and has a slightly darker back. The Tristan albatross also never attains the full white plumage of the wandering albatross, and its bill is about  shorter.

Behavior
The Tristan albatross feeds on fish and cephalopods.

They are monogamous, and do not start breeding until they are about 10 years old.

Range and habitat
Due to the difficulty in distinguishing them from wandering albatrosses, their distribution at sea is still not fully known, but the use of satellite tracking has shown that they forage widely in the South Atlantic, with males foraging west of the breeding islands towards South America and females to the east towards Africa. There have been sightings near Brazil and also off the coast of Australia.

Tristan albatrosses are endemic to the islands of the Tristan da Cunha group and more specifically Gough Island.  The majority of the world's population nest on Gough Island, around 1500 pairs. On some years a pair breeds on Inaccessible Island.

Conservation
They were formerly threatened by introduced species, rats, cats and pigs, but these have now been removed from their breeding islands. However, this resulted in the population of mice, Mus musculus, increasing to the point where they would eat and kill albatross chicks en masse. Even though the chicks are huge compared to the mice, they do not know how to defend themselves appropriately. Today the main threat to the species is believed to be long-line fishing and these mice. Recent counts suggest that the population on Gough has decreased by 28% over 46 years, whereas population modelling predicts annual decline rates of 2.9–5.3%. More recent modelling, conducted over three generations since 1980, suggests a decline equivalent to a >96% reduction in population size over three generations, since declines began. The rate of decline is therefore placed here in the band of 80–100% over three generations (86 years).

Formerly classified as an endangered species by the IUCN, it was suspected to be more threatened than generally assumed and undergoing a marked decline. Following the evaluation of its status, this was found to be correct, and the Tristan albatross was consequently uplisted to Critically Endangered status in 2008.

Footnotes

References

External links
BirdLife Species Factsheet.

Tristan albatross
Birds of islands of the Atlantic Ocean
Birds of subantarctic islands
Fauna of Gough Island
Endemic fauna of Tristan da Cunha
Tristan albatross